Shelby Naomi Coleman (born February 19, 1992) is an American fashion model. She is currently with New York Model Management;

Coleman was born in Evanston, Illinois, and was raised in Skokie, Illinois.  In 2007, was discovered in Chicago by Italian fashion designer Giambattista Valli at a women's wear showing at Saks Fifth Avenue.  The designer soon booked her as an exclusive for his Fall 2008 Ready-to-Wear show in Paris for fashion week.  She was signed to IMG Models New York in 2008.

In January 2009, Coleman was once again featured as an exclusive for Giambattista Valli's pre-fall 2009 show in Florence, Italy. She also appeared in the Akris Resort 2009 line. Coleman has since walked for Tori Burch, Christian Siriano, and Sophie Theallet.  She appeared in Marie Claire UK Beauty in August, 2013, by photographer Jason Hetherington. Coleman was highlighted in New York Magazine's  "Meet the New Girl" in February 2009, and has been featured in "Beauty is Diverse.com, Celebrating the Diversity of Beauty; in Oprah Magazine in May 2012; and "The Bold and the Beautiful: 3 Women Who Paved the Way for Black Models."
 
In 2011, Laura Mercier signed Coleman as a face for their 2011 Fall-Winter and 2012 Spring-Summer beauty campaigns.  She also appeared in Cole Haan's 2011 Fall-Winter campaign. She has worked for Kate Spade, Topshop, Clinique, Gap UK, American Eagle, and New York and Company magazines.

References

External links
Coleman at Models.com

Female models from Illinois
1992 births
Living people
21st-century American women